What's Wrong with the Women? is 1922 American silent Jazz Age drama film, directed by  Roy William Neill, produced by Daniel Carson Goodman, and starring Wilton Lackaye, Barbara Castleton, and Constance Bennett. It is not known whether the film currently survives, which suggests that it is a lost film.

Cast
 Wilton Lackaye as James Bascom
 Constance Bennett as Elise Bascom
 Montagu Love as Arthur Belden
 Julia Swayne Gordon as Mrs. Bascom
 Barbara Castleton as Janet Lee
 Rod La Rocque as Jack Lee
 Huntley Gordon as Loyd Watson
 Paul McAllister as John Mathews
 Mrs. Oscar Hammerstein as A Friend 
 Mrs. De Wolf Hopper as Mrs. Neer (*aka Hedda Hopper)
 Helen Rowland as Baby Helen Lee

References

External links

 
 
Film poster

1922 films
1922 drama films
Silent American drama films
American silent feature films
American black-and-white films
Films directed by Roy William Neill
American independent films
1920s independent films
1920s American films